The 1949 NCAA Golf Championship was the 11th annual NCAA-sanctioned golf tournament to determine the individual and team national champions of men's collegiate golf in the United States.

The tournament was held at the Veenker Memorial Golf Course at the Iowa State College in Ames, Iowa.

North Texas State won the team title by ten strokes, the Eagles' first NCAA team national title.

Individual results

Individual champion
 Harvie Ward, North Carolina

Tournament medalist
 Arnold Palmer, Wake Forest (141)

Team results

Note: Top 10 only
DC = Defending champions

References

NCAA Men's Golf Championship
Golf in Iowa
NCAA Golf Championship
NCAA Golf Championship
NCAA Golf Championship